Louise Kessenikh-Graphemes (1786 — 30 October 1852) was a female officer, the participant of war with Napoleon 1812-1815 Prussian Uhlan Sergeant major. From 1817 she lived in St. Petersburg and was engaged in private business activities.

Biography

Early life and military career 
Louise was born in 1786. Presumably, in the city of Hanau in Prussia. She was born into a family of Jewish jeweler and at birth was given the name Esther Manoa, but at the age of 19 he converted to Christianity and received a new name — Louise, and which went down in history. Soon she married a man by the name of Graphemes, who served as an apprentice in a jewellery workshop. History has not preserved the name of the husband of Louise, but judging by the name, he was a Lutheran; many Lutherans of Germany since the reformation wore Latinized surnames. Louise lived with her husband in Fulda. In 1806 in the family of Graphemes daughter was born, and in 1808 the son. Shortly after the birth of a son to Louise's husband, German hot patriot, striving to fight for the independence of his country, left family and in 1809 went to Russia, where he joined as a volunteer in a Russian Lancer regiment. When the Russian army pursuing the troops of Napoleon, in 1813, entered the territory of Prussia, Louise decides that leaving children in the care of relatives, to volunteer in the Prussian army to find and meet her husband. Louise decided to join the army and become a Lancer, like her husband, but this desire to volunteer was not enough, the volunteer had to be in a regiment of fully uniformed and armed. Many volunteers abandoneware and armed the towns and communities, others were buying uniforms and weapons for their money. And if to arm and clothe the infantry cost is relatively cheap, for the cavalry, these were very considerable sums in those days. In search of patrons who could Finance the purchase of a horse, arms and armor, Louise turned to the Princess Maria Anna,  wife of Prussian Prince  Wilhelm, the king's Frederick William III brother. This romantic request had the desired effect: the Prince and the Princess Louise gave the necessary funds. Louise Graphemes joined as a volunteer in the 2nd königsberg Uhlan regiment of militia, which was komendantova mayor Herman. At the beginning of 1814, the Prussian army marched to the capital of France. The regiment, which served as Graphemes, moved to the French capital via Holland. During this campaign, Louise Graphemes captured officers and six soldiers of the enemy. For this feat she was awarded the Iron cross. Louise, together with his regiment he made a victorious March through France and went to Paris. When on 29 March 1814 the allied troops entered Paris, in the line passing by the Russian lancers Louise suddenly saw her husband. An immense feeling of joy and happiness embraced Louise, but great was the surprise of the surrounding soldiers, watching the Prussian Ulan, sobbing, hugging and kissing a Russian Lancer in the middle of a Parisian street. After the end of the anti-Napoleonic campaign Louise, as the party fighting, was granted a pension, effective March 1816. The first time Louise was retired in August 1816 for several previous months. The amount of the pension, which relied Louise, was 2 thalers per month. It was a normal pension to soldiers and lower ranks of the Prussian army. But such pension hurt Louise, she considered herself one of the heroines of the war of 1813-1815, and the appointment of an ordinary soldier pension brushed her ambition. 2 Thaler per month it was possible to lead a very modest life, barely making ends meet. All of Louise's attempts to increase pension of Prussia failed, but it turned out that it can also apply for the pension in Russia for the deceased in the Russian service of her husband, a Sergeant of Graphemes. At the end of March, 1817 Louisa received a pension the last time in Prussia, issued in further transfer of pensions in Russia and went to St. Petersburg. It is unknown who left her children in Prussia, they lived in Berlin and Fulda. It happened that Louise never returned to Prussia, and to the end of his life he lived in Russia.

Life in St. Petersburg 
In St. Petersburg, Louise married a second time in Riga the famous bookbinder, a native of the city of Cologne (North Rhine-Westphalia) a German Lutheran Johann Cornelius Kessenikh, acquired on the Peterhof road tavern, and in St. Petersburg in the house opposite New Holland  winter kept the dance class popular, widely attended, not once mentioned in the literature. The Inn Red tavern was on the 7th verst of the Peterhof road, on the left Bank of red river, whence it has received its name.

The school was located in a house built in the early 18th century for the Tsar Peter the great on his way to Strelna and Peterhof. There is only one photo of the Inn taken in 1907, and the building itself the building was demolished soon after the revolution, in 1919.

In life, Louise said: 'I have one wish — to be buried above ground'. They say that this desire was fulfilled. Among the old residents of volkovskogo graveyard existed the legend that Louise kessenih was indeed buried above ground — hanging on the chains of the zinc sarcophagus. To verify or refute this fact is not possible, because the grave of Louise kessenih is not preserved. Not left any drawings or photos of her grave.

Her great-great-granddaughter of a famous Soviet actress Tatyana Piletskaya.

Interesting facts 
I must say that Louise Graphemes was not the only woman who hid her gender and who went to war, fought side by side with men. Historically, 22 of the German woman, the heroine of the war of 1813-1815.

See also 

 Musin-Pushkin House (Saint Petersburg)

References

External links
  Фройляйн на коне: прусских «кавалерист-девиц» награждали специально учреждённым орденом
 Самая храбрая еврейка Kёнигсберга

1852 deaths
People from Hanau
Women in war
1786 births
Recipients of the Iron Cross, 2nd class
Russian people of German descent
Russian Jews